Smoky Lake is a town in central Alberta, Canada. It lies between the North Saskatchewan River, Smoky Creek and White Earth Creek, in a mainly agricultural area. The provincial historic site of Victoria Settlement is nearby. The Woods Cree, a First Nations people, named "Smoking Lake" for the smoke from ceremonies performed on the shore; the name Smoky Lake may also be based in the mist that rose from the lake in great quantities at sundown. 
One of its churches, the St. Onuphrius Ukrainian-Catholic, built in 1907, has been moved to the Canadian Museum of History in Gatineau, Quebec. It is in Census Division No. 12 and is the municipal office for the Smoky Lake County.

Demographics 

In the 2016 Census of Population conducted by Statistics Canada, the Town of Smoky Lake recorded a population of 964 living in 421 of its 499 total private dwellings, a  change from its 2011 population of 1,022.

Notable people 

 Mary Burzminski, track and field athlete
 Eddie Carroll, Actor, voice over
 John Dubetz, Alberta legislator
 Terry Ewasiuk, professional ice hockey player
 Isidore Goresky, Alberta legislator
 Ray Kinasewich, professional ice hockey player
 Steve Zarusky, Alberta legislator

See also 
List of communities in Alberta
List of towns in Alberta

References

External links 

1923 establishments in Alberta
Towns in Alberta